The 1979 Ohio State Buckeyes football team represented the Ohio State University in the 1979 Big Ten Conference football season. The Buckeyes compiled an 11–1 record, including the 1980 Rose Bowl in Pasadena, California, where they lost, 17–16, to the USC Trojans.

Schedule

Roster

Depth chart

Coaching staff
 Earle Bruce - Head Coach (1st year)
 Pete Carroll - Defensive Backs (1st year)
 Dennis Fryzel - Defensive Coordinator (1st year)
 Glen Mason - Offensive Line / Defensive Inside Linebackers (2nd year)
 Bill Myles - Offensive Line (3rd year)
 Wayne Stanley - Running Backs (1st year)
 Steve Szabo - Defensive Line (1st year)
 Bob Tucker - Defensive Outside Linebackers (1st year)
 Fred Zechman - Quarterbacks/Receivers (1st year)

1980 NFL draftees

Game summaries

Syracuse

Minnesota

Washington State

    
    
    
    
    
    
    
    
    
    
    
    

The longest pass in school history to date, an 86-yard bomb from Art Schlichter to Calvin Murray, helped propel Ohio State to a 45-29 win over Washington State. The previous record was an 80-yard pass from Joe Sparma to Bob Klein in 1961 versus Michigan.

UCLA

Northwestern

Indiana

Wisconsin

Michigan State

Illinois

Iowa

at Michigan

Ohio State clinched the Big Ten title and a trip to the Rose Bowl with an 18-15 victory over their archrivals. The Buckeyes had not beaten nor scored a touchdown against Michigan since 1975, the last time they had gone to Pasadena.

Rose Bowl

References

Ohio State
Ohio State Buckeyes football seasons
Big Ten Conference football champion seasons
Ohio State Buckeyes football